Salvador Sánchez Cerén (born 18 June 1944) is a Salvadoran politician who served as the 42nd President of El Salvador between 1 June 2014 and 1 June 2019. He took office on 1 June 2014, after winning the 2014 presidential election as the candidate of the left-wing Farabundo Martí National Liberation Front (FMLN). He previously served as Vice President under President Mauricio Funes from 2009 to 2014. He was also a guerrilla leader in the Civil War and is the first and only ex-rebel to serve as president.

Early life
Sánchez Cerén was born in Quezaltepeque in the department of La Libertad, and was the ninth of twelve children, three of his siblings died at young age. His parents struggled to raise nine children. His father, Antonio Alfonso Sánchez was a carpenter and his mother, Dolores Hernández was a merchant. Salvador Sánchez Cerén at a young age had to work with his family to help the family survive. At a young age he was exposed to collective work. His working-class background has always characterized Salvador Sánchez Cerén as a man of communal living, anti-free trade, and redistribution of wealth. He attended Escuela de Varones José Dolores La Reynaga for his middle school education. He attended Alberto Masferrer School in San Salvador and it was there where his political consciousness and participation developed.  After graduating as a teacher, he taught for ten years in public and rural schools.

Political ideology
His political ideology derives from the various revolutionary left-wing organizations of which he was a member. He became politically active in the late 1960s when he was a student at Alberto Masferrer School, but he was not part of any political organization until he was introduced to the Unified Popular Action Front (FUAR or Frente Unido de Accion Revolucionaria). The FUAR exposed him for the first time to the political arena and allowed his involvement in the student movement.

He was a member of the PRAM (Partido Revolucionario Abril y Mayo), a political party that was against the dictatorship and advocated anti-imperialism. Then he joined (UDN) Union Democratic Nacionalista and PAR (Partido Accion Renovadora). He was also a participant of the (UNO) Union Nacional Oppositora as a member of the UDN. In essence his experience and the things he learned in San Salvador at Masferrer school from his peers he took back to his town and began to implement it. He was an active member of the ANDES 21 de Junio, a teachers union that practiced and believed in the ideas of Paulo Freire and his analysis on pedagogy. In the 1970s he joined the Fuerzas Populares de Liberación "Farabundo Martí" (FPL), one of the five left-wing organizations, all of differing Marxist–Leninist tendencies, that later merged to form the Farabundo Martí National Liberation Front (FMLN).

Commander Leonel González
With the start of the Salvadoran Civil War in 1980, Sánchez Cerén adopted the pseudonym Commander Leonel González, as he was also appointed to the position of "comandante" or commander.

In 1984 Sánchez Cerén became a Commanding General of the FMLN, until the signing of the Chapultepec Peace Accords in 1992, when the guerrillas surrendered their weapons and became a legal political party. Under the leadership of Sánchez Cerén, the FMLN conducted itself in the following manner, according to US Ambassador Charles Glazer in a classified diplomatic cable:

The FMLN leadership described its ideology during the war in a document called "Fundamental Programs for the Salvadoran Revolution," a guerrilla manifesto captured from FMLN Commander Nidia Diaz (who would join Sánchez Cerén as an FMLN politician in the Salvadoran legislature) in April 1985. The FMLN's "fundamental programs" included the following points in 1991:

 "To establish economic, political, cultural, technical and social bases to build the construction of socialism."
 "The construction of democracy and socialism."
 "Our organization is a working class party. Our ideology is Marxism-Leninism."

Political career 
In 2000, Sánchez Cerén was elected as a deputy for the FMLN in the Legislative Assembly and was re-elected in 2003 and 2006. Between 2001 and 2004 he served as the general coordinator of his party. In 2006, following the death of Salvadoran Communist Party leader and FMLN Commander Schafik Handal, he succeeded Handal as head of the legislative portion of the FMLN. In April 2007 he was chosen as the running mate of Mauricio Funes in the 2009 presidential election. Funes and Sánchez Cerén defeated the ruling Nationalist Republican Alliance (ARENA).

President of El Salvador

Salvador Sánchez Cerén was sworn in as president. El Salvador held presidential elections. Sánchez Cerén was the FMLN's presidential candidate, and gained support. According to Salvadoran law, a candidate must obtain 50% + 1 vote in order to win presidential elections. Sánchez Cerén attained the leading votes in the elections on 2 February but not the majority enough to win, so he and Norman Quijano competed in the second round. Sánchez Cerén received 50.11% of the vote, compared with 49.89% for Quijano in an election contested as fraudulent by the opposing candidate.

Since October 2016, his government and the FMLN have defended a project of partial legalization of abortion (in case of rape or of danger for the life of the mother) but have had to contend with the right-wing opposition which has blocked the reforms in parliament.

In April 2017, El Salvador became the first country in the world to forbid the mining of metal on its territory, for environmental and public health reasons.

In August 2018, his government decided to establish diplomatic relationship with the People's Republic of China.

References

External links

 
 Biography by CIDOB (in Spanish)

|-

|-

1944 births
Farabundo Martí National Liberation Front politicians
Living people
Members of the Legislative Assembly of El Salvador
People from Quezaltepeque
People of the Salvadoran Civil War
Presidents of El Salvador
Presidents pro tempore of the Community of Latin American and Caribbean States
Salvadoran Roman Catholics
Vice presidents of El Salvador
Education ministers of El Salvador